The Round Table class, also known as the Sir Lancelot class, was a British ship class designed for amphibious warfare missions in support of the main amphibious warfare ships. They were designated landing ship logistics (LSL). The class was almost certainly so named on account of the phonetic similarity between the abbreviation LSL and Lance-'S'-Lot. 

All ships were named after Knights of the Round Table.

Class history
In December 1961, the Ministry of Transport ordered the first in a new class of 6,000-ton military supply vessels from Fairfield Shipbuilding and Engineering Company of Govan. The class was designed to replace the World War II-era Mark 8 Landing Craft Tank vessels in service. The first ship, was launched in June 1963.

The ships had both bow and stern doors leading onto the main vehicle deck, making them roll-on/roll-off, combined with ramps that led to upper and lower vehicle decks. Thanks to their shallow draught, they could beach themselves and use the bow doors for speedy unloading of troops and equipment. The ships also had helicopter decks on both the upper vehicle deck and behind the superstructure.

The ships were operated and managed by the British India Steam Navigation Company for the Royal Army Service Corps until January 1970, then were transferred to the Royal Fleet Auxiliary. One vessel, was lost during the Falklands War, while another, was badly damaged. The former was replaced by a new,  vessel of the same name, while the latter was rebuilt and returned to service.

, formerly operated by the Royal Australian Navy, was based on the Round Table design.

Ships

References

External links

 

Amphibious warfare vessel classes
 
 
Ship classes of the Royal Navy